Róbert Štefko (born 28 May 1968) is a retired Slovak long-distance runner. He finished fourth in the 1994 European Athletics Championships – Men's 10,000 metres in a time of 28:08.02, less than 2 seconds behind the winner Abel Antón of Spain. He competed in the men's marathon at the 2000 Summer Olympics representing Slovakia and the same event at the 2004 Summer Olympics representing the Czech Republic. In April 2004, he became a Czech citizen. 

In 1999 he won his home-town marathon, the Košice Peace Marathon, in 2:14:10.  His personal best time at that distance is 2:09:53, set at the London Marathon in 1998.

References

External links
 
 

1968 births
Living people
Athletes (track and field) at the 1996 Summer Olympics
Athletes (track and field) at the 2000 Summer Olympics
Athletes (track and field) at the 2004 Summer Olympics
Slovak male long-distance runners
Slovak male marathon runners
Czech male long-distance runners
Czech male marathon runners
Olympic athletes of Slovakia
Olympic athletes of the Czech Republic
Place of birth missing (living people)
Sportspeople from Košice